Nikolai Grigorievich Chebotaryov (often spelled Chebotarov or Chebotarev) ( – 2 July 1947) was a Ukrainian and Soviet mathematician. He is best known for the Chebotaryov density theorem.

He was a student of Dmitry Grave, a Russian mathematician. Chebotaryov worked on the algebra of polynomials, in particular examining the distribution of the zeros. He also studied Galois theory and wrote a textbook on the subject titled Basic Galois Theory.
His ideas were used by Emil Artin to prove the Artin reciprocity law.
He worked with his student Anatoly Dorodnov on a generalization of the quadrature of the lune, and proved the conjecture now known as the Chebotaryov theorem on roots of unity.

Early life
Nikolai Chebotaryov was born on 15 June 1894 in Kamianets-Podilskyi, Russian Empire (now in Ukraine). He entered the department of physics and mathematics at Kyiv University in 1912. In 1928 he became a professor at Kazan University, remaining there for the rest of his life. He died on 2 July 1947. He was an atheist. On 14 May 2010 a memorial plaque for Nikolai Chebotaryov was unveiled on the main administration building of I.I. Mechnikov Odessa National University.

References

1894 births
1947 deaths
People from Kamianets-Podilskyi
People from Kamenets-Podolsky Uyezd
Ukrainian people of Russian descent
20th-century Russian mathematicians
Soviet mathematicians
Russian atheists
Ukrainian mathematicians
Number theorists
Corresponding Members of the USSR Academy of Sciences
Stalin Prize winners
Recipients of the Order of Lenin
Recipients of the Order of the Red Banner of Labour